is a 1976 Japanese film directed by Kon Ichikawa. The film is the first in Kon Ichikawa's and Kōji Ishizaka's Kindaichi Series. Ichikawa remade the film in 2006 as The Inugamis. The soundtrack is composed by Yuji Ohno.

Murders take place within the very rich Inugami family in connection with a disputed will.

Cast
Kōji Ishizaka as Kosuke Kindaichi
Yoko Shimada as Tamayo Nonomiya
Teruhiko Aoi as Sukekiyo Inugami / Shizuma Aonuma
Mieko Takamine as Matsuko Inugami
Mitsuko Kusabue as Umeko Inugami
Ryoko Sakaguchi as Haru
Takeo Chii as Suketake Inugami
Akiji Kobayashi as Kôkichi Inugami
Kyōko Kishida as The Koto Player
Hideji Ōtaki as Oyama
Eitaro Ozawa as Kyozo Furudate
Takeshi Katō as Detective Tachibana
Rentarō Mikuni as Sahei Inugami

Awards and nominations

1st Hochi Film Award
 Won: Best Film
19th Blue Ribbon Awards
 Won Best Supporting Actress Mieko Takamine

References

External links
 

1976 films
Films directed by Kon Ichikawa
1970s Japanese-language films
Toho films
Films with screenplays by Kon Ichikawa
Films scored by Yuji Ohno
1970s Japanese films